Pitruroon is a 2013 Indian Marathi Language film directed by Nitish Bharadwaj. The film is a directional debut of Nitish Bharadwaj and it based on Runa, a  Kannada story by Sudha Murty.

Plot 
A archeologist investigates history of his own family when coming across a lookalike during visit to a village.

Cast 

 Suhas Joshi
 Sachin Khedekar
 Tanuja
 Poorvi Bhave

References

External links 

2010s Marathi-language films
2013 films